All Nepal National Independent Students Union may refer to:

 All Nepal National Independent Students' Union (Revolutionary)
 All Nepal National Free Students Union (Sixth)
 All Nepal National Independent Students Union (Sixth) (RJM group)
 All Nepal National Independent Students Union (Unified)

See also 
 All Nepal National Free Students Union (disambiguation)